Aïn Yagout (Arabic: عين ياقوت · chaoui: ⵜⴰⴳⵓⵜ) is an Algerian community in Villa Batna, 35 km northeast of Batna and 75 km southwest of Constantine.

Location 
The territory of Aïn Yagout is located to the northeast of the wilaya of Batna.

Towns of the municipality 
The communities of Aïn Yagout are made up of 10 localities:

 Thagout
 Dahr Azem
 El Malha
 Tehawit
 Ayath Mloule
 Bir Ammar
 Draa Boultif
 Gabel
 Mechta Chorfa
 Theniet Saïda

History 
The city of Aïn Yagout was a village located around a fountain. Previously it was called Douar Sidi Ali.

In 1873, the French army decided to make it a place of cantonment. After a massive exodus of residents from neighboring villages to these places, the French erected a gendarmerie barracks near the fountain.

Aïn Yagout was granted commune status on January 12, 1957.

Toponymie 
The name of the town Ain Yagout is an arabized toponym formed by two components: عين Aïn meaning "source" and the suffix ياقوت Yakout (or Yagout) meaning "ruby" or "hyacinth" but the origin of the appellation is Tamazight Berber Thagouth ⵜⴰⴳⵓⵜ meaning "fog"

Demography

Demographic evolution

Festivals 
 Yennayer or Yennar (Amazigh New Year).
 Thafsouth (The beginning of spring)

Communes of Batna Province